This is a list of electoral division results for the Australian 2001 federal election for the Australian Capital Territory and the Northern Territory.
__toc__

Australian Capital Territory

Canberra

Fraser

Northern Territory

Lingiari

Solomon

See also 

 Members of the Australian House of Representatives, 2001–2004

References 

Territories 2001